Gordon M. Johnson (born December 16, 1949) is an American Democratic Party politician who has served in the New Jersey Senate since 2022, where he represents the 37th Legislative District, having represented the same district in the New Jersey General Assembly from 2002 to 2022.

Biography
Johnson grew up in Englewood, New Jersey where he still resides. His mother was a nurse and his father was a United States Customs Agent. He attended St. Cecilia High School, received a B.S. from St. Thomas Aquinas College in Social Science and Criminal Justice, and an M.A. from Seton Hall University in Administration and Supervision. He served in the United States Army Reserve with the rank of Major (United States), and participated in Operation Desert Storm in 1990 and 1991 and Operation Joint Endeavor in 1996. Johnson retired with the rank of Major from the United States Army Reserve in 2000. He is highly decorated and holds the National Defense Service Medal, Bronze Star, Meritorious Service Medal, Southwest Asia Service Medal, NATO Service Medal, and Kuwait Liberation Medal.

He was the Bergen County Sheriff from 2001–2002, and was with the Bergen County Sheriff’s Department since 1999.  Mr. Johnson was the first African-American to hold countywide office in Bergen and was the first African-American Sheriff in Bergen County. Johnson served as an Undersheriff in the Bergen County Sheriff’s Department, a position he has filled from 1999-2001 and 2002-2005. In the days following September 11, 2001, Sheriff Johnson served as commander of the George Washington Bridge as part Bergen County's response to the terrorist attacks. According to the Record, Sheriff Johnson "has widely been credited with helping to ease the rancor and divisiveness within the department."

He served for 24 years with the Englewood Police Department, attaining the rank of Patrol Sergeant. He is also experienced in labor relations and served as President of the State P.B.A. Supervisory Officers Association-Local #216.

On June 6, 2006, Johnson won the Democratic Party primary for the Engelwood City Council at-large by unseating incumbent Rev. Vernon Walton; Victory in the primary is tantamount to winning the seat in this Democratic Party stronghold. On Election Day, November 7, 2006, Johnson won the at-large seat, defeating Republican Harry Kanner.  Johnson received 5,132 votes, with Kanner receiving 1,501 votes. In August 2008, Johnson announced that he will be stepping down from his Englewood City Council seat by March 2008. While Johnson was grandfathered in from legislation banning dual office holding, he would step down to "follow the will of the people".

Legislative career
Gordon Johnson began his first term as a State Assemblyman in 2002, running on a ticket with Senator Byron Baer and Assemblywoman Loretta Weinberg.  During his first term, he was the prime sponsor of laws to expand DNA collection from violent offenders and requiring towing companies to accept cash and credit card payment.

As part of the General Assembly Leadership, Assemblyman Johnson serves in the position of Deputy Speaker.  He is the Chair of the Commerce and Economic Development Committee, Vice-Chair of the Judiciary Committee, member of the Budget Committee and also serves on the New Jersey Public Safety Communications Commission.  Previously, he served as the Majority Conference Leader, a leadership post in the New Jersey State Assembly during the 2012-2013 legislative session.  From 2006 to 2011 Assemblyman Johnson served as Chair of the Assembly Law and Public Safety Committee.

Johnson served as Chair of the Assembly Law and Public Safety Committee from 2006 to 2011 before becoming Majority Conference Leader in 2011.  During his tenure as Chair, the committee took up legislation to abolish the death penalty.  The committee also took up the issue of DNA evidence, expanding the collection of DNA for use by police, defendants, and those currently incarcerated.  He has sponsored laws to commemorate the comfort women of World War II, enhanced the Crime Victim's Bill of Rights, and reform the State Board of Medical Examiners. Johnson was the prime sponsor of legislation in the Assembly that would limit rent increases for certain seniors. Other bills have included the "DREAMer's act" a law that expands access to education for certain New Jersey students, rail and transportation safety, and veterans issues. Assemblyman Johnson recently sponsored legislation to expand New Jersey's film and digital media production tax credit program to generate revenue and jobs in New Jersey.

During his 2007 campaign for the Assembly, Assemblyman Johnson faced Republican challengers Frank J. Cifarelli and Wojciech J. Siemaszkiewicz.  Assemblyman Johnson received 21,228 votes, with the Republican vote at 9,051 and 8,921.  In the 2009 general election, Johnson faced Republicans Barry Bellin and Siemaszkiewicz.  Johnson received 32,845 votes with the Republicans receiving 16,266 and 15,635 votes.  In the general elections in years 2011 and 2013 Assemblyman Johnson outpaced Republican challengers by an almost 2-1 margin.

In 2007 Johnson's contributions to Lyndon LaRouche's political action committee became a subject of criticism. Johnson reportedly gave a total of $1,850 in 2005 and 2006. He apologized repeatedly, saying he regretted not vetting the organization more carefully. Johnson was reelected handily, though he received 1,200 fewer votes than his running mate, a dropoff of over 5%.

In 2021, Johnson declared he would seek the District 37 Senate seat due to Loretta Weinberg's announcement that she would be retiring at the end of her term. Johnson's bid was endorsed by both Governor Phil Murphy and Senator Weinberg, along with the backing of the Bergen County Democratic party. Johnson went against fellow Assemblywoman Valerie Vainieri-Huttle in the 2021 Democratic Primary and won, defeating her 3-1.

Committees 
Committee assignments for the current session are:
Budget and Appropriations
Commerce
Transportation

District 37
Each of the 40 districts in the New Jersey Legislature has one representative in the New Jersey Senate and two members in the New Jersey General Assembly. The representatives from the 37th District for the 2022—23 Legislative Session are:
Senator Gordon M. Johnson (D)
Assemblywoman Shama Haider (D)
Assemblywoman Ellen Park (D)

References

External links
Senator Johnson's legislative web page, New Jersey Legislature
New Jersey Legislature financial disclosure forms
2009  2008 2007  2006  2005  2004 
Campaign Website for Weinberg Johnson, and Huttle 2007
New Jersey Voter Information Website 2005

|-

|-

1949 births
20th-century African-American people
21st-century African-American politicians
21st-century American politicians
African-American sheriffs
African-American state legislators in New Jersey
Living people
Military personnel from New Jersey
New Jersey city council members
Democratic Party members of the New Jersey General Assembly
New Jersey sheriffs
Democratic Party New Jersey state senators
People from Englewood, New Jersey
Politicians from Bergen County, New Jersey
Seton Hall University alumni
St. Cecilia High School (New Jersey) alumni
St. Thomas Aquinas College alumni
United States Army officers
United States Army personnel of the Gulf War
United States Army reservists